Clément Ric (born 18 July 1988) is a French rugby union player. His position is Prop and he currently plays for Lyon OU in the Top 14.

Honours
Top 14 Champion – 2009–10

References

1988 births
Living people
French rugby union players
Sportspeople from Cantal
ASM Clermont Auvergne players
Rugby union props